Vanessa de Oliveira (born 12 March 1975) is a Brazilian writer and former call girl.

Background 
Born in Porto Alegre, de Oliveira became known in 2006 with her first autobiographical book, O diário de Marise - A vida real de uma garota de programa, which recounts, among other things, most of her life as a sex worker. The book was translated in English and Italian and released in Latin America, Portugal, Italy and in the United States. In the following years, she became the author of five other books that discuss sex, behavior, relationships and religion.  Meanwhile, in 2007 and 2008, de Oliveira also starred in three adult movies.

She is also a lecturer, a columnist in newspapers and websites and she owns her own brand of lingerie.

Books 
 O Diário de Marise, Editora Matrix, 2006, . 
 100 Segredos de uma Garota de Programa (with Reinaldo Bim Toigo), Editora Matrix, 2007, .
 Seduzir Clientes, Editora Matrix, 2008, .
 Ele te Traiu? Problema Dele!, Editora Matrix, 2009, .
 Reunião de Bruxas, Editora Anubis, 2011, .
 Psicopatas do Coração, Editora Urbanas, 2012, .

Filmography 
 2007 - Vanessa de Oliveira
 2008 - A Dama de Vermelho 
 2008 - Gostosa, Safada e

References

External links 
 
 

1975 births
Living people
Brazilian female prostitutes
People from Porto Alegre
Brazilian women writers
Brazilian women journalists
Brazilian pornographic film actresses